Men of the Sea also known as Baltic Sailors is a 1938 Soviet war film directed by Aleksandr Faintsimmer. The film is about the Bolshevik Kronstadt sailors' 1919 defense of Petrograd from the White Army during the Russian Civil War.

Cast 
P. Gofman as Pilot Bezenchuk
Galina Inyutina as Glafira
Pyotr Kirillov as Dietrich
Vladimir Kryuger as Gunner Zheslov
Boris Livanov as Commissar Vikhoriev
K. Matrossov as Lavretski
V. Safranov as Vaviloo
Leonid Smit as Signal Man Kolessov
Konstantin Sorokin as Orderly
Vladimir Uralsky as Machinist Khoritonich
L. Viven as Commander Rostovtsev

Further reading

External links 

Soviet black-and-white films
Films based on British novels
Films based on works by Frederick Marryat
1930s Russian-language films
Russian Revolution films
Soviet war drama films
Films directed by Aleksandr Faintsimmer
Belarusfilm films
Belarusian drama films
1930s war drama films
1938 drama films
1938 films